"Advertising Space" is a song by British singer Robbie Williams, for his sixth studio album, Intensive Care (2005). It was released as the third single from the album on 12 December 2005 and reached number eight on the UK Singles Chart. Williams jokingly called the song his "Candle in the Wind". In the video, largely filmed in a room above the Belle Vue pub in Blackpool in the United Kingdom, Williams emulates Elvis in movement, appearance, and habits.

Track listings
UK CD1 and Australian CD single
 "Advertising Space"
 "Family Coach"

UK CD2
 "Advertising Space"
 "Twist"
 "Don't Say No"
 Gallery (U-MYX)

UK DVD single
 "Advertising Space" (video)
 "Don't Say No" (audio)
 "Overture for Berlin" (audio)

Credits and personnel
Credits are taken from the Intensive Care album booklet.

Studios
 Recorded between June 2003 and May 2005 at Air Studios, The Townhouse (London, England), Rockband East and West, and Henson Studios (Los Angeles)
 Mixed at Mix This! (Pacific Palisades, Los Angeles)
 Strings engineered at NRG (North Hollywood, California)
 Mastered at Metropolis Mastering (London, England)

Personnel

 Robbie Williams – writing, lead vocals, production
 Stephen Duffy – writing, Fender Mustang guitar, Martin acoustic guitar, Ethereal Electronic Korg keyboards, production
 Claire Worrall – backing vocals, Bösendorfer piano
 Jerry Meehan – Fender Precision Bass guitar
 Greg Leisz – lap and pedal steel guitars
 Jebin Bruni – Prophet-5
 Matt Chamberlain – drums, percussion
 David Campbell – string arrangement, conducting
 Allen Sides – string engineering
 Bob Clearmountain – mixing
 Tony Cousins – mastering

Charts

Weekly charts

Year-end charts

Release history

References

2005 singles
2005 songs
Chrysalis Records singles
Music videos directed by David LaChapelle
Robbie Williams songs
Songs about Elvis Presley
Songs written by Robbie Williams
Songs written by Stephen Duffy